Semerun (also Romanized as Semerūn and Semrun; also known as Semīrūn and Sīmerūn) is a village in Tut-e Nadeh Rural District, in the Central District of Dana County, Kohgiluyeh and Boyer-Ahmad Province, Iran. At the 2006 census, its population was 583, in 124 families.

References 

Populated places in Dana County